Juan Sandalio Arzuaga Anitua (3 September 1880 – 26 August 1951) was a Spanish footballer who played as a defender for Athletic Club, and later a coach of Athletic.

Club career
Juan Arzuaga was born in Bilbao on 3 September 1880, and was baptized on the following day, in the church of San Nicolás de Bari in the Biscay capital. As a child he studied in England and excelled in rugby. Between 1902 and 1904 he studied Mechanical Engineering at the Mittweida technical school (Saxony, Germany), and while there, he began playing football with Mittweidaer Ballspiel-Club, the school's football team, which had been founded in 1896 by students. In Mittweida, he gained popularity as a football and rugby player, as well as a referee. When he returned to Bilbao, settling in San Sebastián, he did so with great knowledge about football, which was only beginning to take shape in Spain. He was among the founding members of San Sebastián Recreation Club, which was the very first football club in San Sebastián. He then became one of the first footballers of the newly formed club in 1904, thus beginning his footballing career at the advanced age of 24. Together with Alfonso Sena, he was part of the Recreation Club that played in the 1905 Copa del Rey.

At Recreation Club, he stood out for his defensive skills, which earned him a move to Athletic Club in 1905, making his competitive debut on 11 April 1906, at the 1906 Copa del Rey, in a 2–1 win over Recreativo de Huelva, but he did not play in the final against Madrid FC, and without him, Athletic conceded 4 goals in a 1–4 loss. In 1907, the best players from Athletic and Unión Vizcaino came together to form Bizcaya, which was specially created to take part in the 1907 Copa del Rey, and Arzuaga was elected into the team, forming a defensive partnership with his former Recreation Club teammate, Alfonso Sena of Vizcaino, which played a very important role in helping Bizcaya reach the final, and this time he started and nearly kept a clean-sheet, but they lost to Madrid once again, courtesy of a late goal from Manuel Prast.

He was a member of the Athletic side that won back-to-back Copa del Rey titles in 1910 and 1911, helping his side keep a clean-sheet in the 1910 final (UECF) in a 1–0 win over Vasconia, the name under which the newly founded Real Sociedad played. He become the captain of the team in 1911. He remained loyal to Athletic until 1912, when the club decided that the low form of an aging Arzuaga did not allow him to continue defending the colours of Athletic, so he was dropped from the first team, and enventually, he left and joined Club Deportivo Bilbao, with whom he retired in 1914 at the age of 34.

International career
On 25 May 1913, the 33-year-old Juan Arzuaga went down in history as one of the eleven footballers who played in the very first unofficial game of the Spanish national team at Estadio de Amute in Hondarribia. They faced a French national side represented by the USFSA, and it was Arzuaga (playing as a forward on the day) who netted an 85th-minute equalizer to salvage a 1–1 draw.

Managerial career
As a coach, he managed Athletic Bilbao from 3 December 1921 until 20 March 1922.

Honours
Athletic Bilbao
Copa del Rey: 1910, 1911
Runner-up: 1907

See also
List of Athletic Bilbao managers

References

1880 births
1951 deaths
Spanish footballers
Association football defenders
Footballers from Bilbao
Athletic Bilbao footballers
Spanish football managers
Athletic Bilbao managers